Episernus is a genus of beetle ranging in Holarctic, of western distribution in North America, including the Palearctic and the Nearctic. Episernus is similar to Ernobius, but the side margin of the pronotum in the anterior part is effaced, and the antennae are 10-segmented. They consume conifers. For males, the body is more slender. In females, the antennae are shorter.

Selected species

References

External links

Episernus at Fauna Europaea

Ptinidae
Bostrichiformia genera